Kyriakos Giannopoulos (born 17 April 1959) is a Greek former water polo player who competed in the 1980 Summer Olympics, in the 1984 Summer Olympics, in the 1988 Summer Olympics, and in the 1992 Summer Olympics.

See also
 Greece men's Olympic water polo team records and statistics
 List of players who have appeared in multiple men's Olympic water polo tournaments
 List of men's Olympic water polo tournament top goalscorers

References

External links
 

1959 births
Living people
Greek male water polo players
Olympiacos Water Polo Club players
Olympic water polo players of Greece
Water polo players at the 1980 Summer Olympics
Water polo players at the 1984 Summer Olympics
Water polo players at the 1988 Summer Olympics
Water polo players at the 1992 Summer Olympics
20th-century Greek people